Climacocystis is a genus of poroid fungi in the family Fomitopsidaceae. Until recently, it was monotypic genus, containing the single widespread species Climacocystis borealis. In 2014, Chinese mycologists added the newly described species Climacocystis montana. The generic name combines the name Climacodon with the Ancient Greek word  ("bladder").

References

Fomitopsidaceae
Polyporales genera
Taxa described in 1958